Ralph Charles Lancaster (25 November 1907 – 28 August 1942) was an Australian rules footballer who played for Geelong in the Victorian Football League (VFL).

Family
The son of Thomas Stanley Lancaster (1878-1960), the Town Clerk of Newtown and Chilwell, and Maud Amelia Lancaster (1878-1938), née Cory, Ralph Charles Lancaster was born in Numurkah on 25 November 1907.

He married Jean Loveniah McCurdy (1912-1968), later Mrs Arnold Start Henderson, in 1938.

Football
Lancaster was recruited locally, from Geelong College.

A rover, he kicked 20 goals in his debut season, and the following year was 19th. man in Geelong's 1930 VFL Grand Final loss to Collingwood.

Military service
During World War II, Lancaster served in New Guinea as a Gunner with the 9th Light Anti-Aircraft Battery, of the Royal Australian Artillery.

Death
He died of wounds sustained whilst on active service in New Guinea on 28 August 1942.

He is buried at the Port Moresby (Bomana) War Cemetery.

See also
 List of Victorian Football League players who died on active service

Notes

References
 Holmesby, Russell and Main, Jim (2007). The Encyclopedia of AFL Footballers. 7th ed. Melbourne: Bas Publishing.
 Main, J. & Allen, D., "Lancaster, Ralph", pp.286-287 in Main, J. & Allen, D., Fallen – The Ultimate Heroes: Footballers Who Never Returned From War, Crown Content, (Melbourne), 2002. 
 World War Two Nominal Roll: Gunner Raplh (sic) Charles Lancaster (VX44992), Department of Veterans' Affairs.
 Roll of Honour: Gunner Ralph Charles Lancaster (VX44992), Australian War Memorial.
 Roll of Honour Circular: Gunner Ralph Charles Lancaster (VX44992) collection of the Australian War Memorial.
 B883, VX44992: World War Two Service Record: Gunner Raplh (sic) Charles Lancaster (VX44992), National Archives of Australia.

External links
 
 
 Ralph Lancaster at Boyles Football Photos.

1907 births
1942 deaths
People educated at Geelong College
Australian rules footballers from Victoria (Australia)
Geelong Football Club players
Newtown & Chilwell Football Club players
Australian military personnel killed in World War II
Australian Army personnel of World War II
Australian Army soldiers
Military personnel from Victoria (Australia)